was a Japanese manga artist. During the time in which manga was often distributed through lending libraries, Sonoda used the pen name .

His best known works are Akatasuki Sentōtai, Sangokushi and Akakichi no Eleven. Akatasuki Sentōtai ran afoul of Japanese sentiment in the 1960s against military manga and has since fallen out of circulation.

Biography 
Sonoda was born in Osaka in 1940.

Works 
 
  written by Shunsuke Sagara
  written by Ikki Kajiwara
 
  written by Sentarō Kubota and Jūzō Yamasaki

External links
Japanese Request to Republish Akatasuki Sentōtai
Japanese Site Detailing Antiwar Manga Protests Sentiments

People from Osaka
Manga artists
1940 births
1997 deaths